The Chief Financial Officers (CFO) Act of 1990 (Public Law 101–576) signed into law by President George H. W. Bush on November 15, 1990, is a United States federal law intended to improve the government's financial management, outlining standards of financial performance and disclosure. Among other measures, the Office of Management and Budget (OMB) was given greater authority over federal financial management. For each of 24 federal departments and agencies, the position of chief financial officer was created. In accordance with the CFO Act, each agency or department vests its financial management functions in its chief financial officer. The following is a list of the 24 affected agencies:

Department of Agriculture
Department of Commerce
Department of Defense
Department of Education
Department of Energy
Department of Health and Human Services
Department of Homeland Security
Department of Housing and Urban Development
Department of Interior
Department of Justice
Department of Labor
Department of State
Department of Transportation
Department of Treasury
Department of Veterans Affairs
Environmental Protection Agency
National Aeronautics and Space Administration
Agency for International Development
Social Security Administration
General Services Administration
National Science Foundation
Nuclear Regulatory Commission
Office of Personnel Management
Small Business Administration

The Act created a new position in the OMB, the Deputy Director for Management, who is the government's chief financial management official. It also created a new sub-division of the OMB, the Office of Federal Financial Management (OFFM), to carry out government-wide financial management responsibilities. The OFFM's chief officer was designated as the newly created Controller position. Both the Deputy Director for Management and the Controller are appointed by the President with the advice and consent of the Senate.

The Committee on Government Reform oversees the management and infrastructure of the federal agencies, including those covered by the CFO Act.

The CFO Act also established the CFO Council, consisting of the CFOs and Deputy CFOs of the largest federal agencies and senior officials of OMB and Treasury.

For a discussion of the history and motivation underlying the CFO Act - with particular emphasis on the difficulties the U.S. Department of Defense has experienced attempting to comply with the financial-statement reporting requirements of the Act - see "Financial Accountability at the DOD:  Reviewing the Bidding," published in the July 2009 issue of the Defense Acquisition Review Journal, pgs. 181–196.

The CFO Act was authored by staff of the House of Representatives Committee on Government Operations, now the Committee of Government Oversight and Reform, under the leadership of Committee Chairman John Conyers (D-MI) and Ranking Minority Member Frank Horton (R-NY).  The CFO Act passed the House of Representatives by Unanimous Consent.

See also
Federal Accounting Standards Advisory Board (FASAB)

References

External links
CFO Council Website
Guide to the CFO Act (U.S. General Accounting Office now known as the Government Accountability Office)
Text of the CFO Act of 1990
Where Is The Money FAQ: Who's In Charge

1990 in law
United States federal government administration legislation
Government finances in the United States